Bosut can refer to:

 Bosut (river), a river in Croatia and Serbia.
 Bosut (Sremska Mitrovica), a village in Serbia.